Laurent Joly (born 16 July 1976) is a French historian and a specialist of Vichy France and antisemitism.

Life and career 
Born in 1976, Joly earned a doctorate in history at the Pantheon-Sorbonne University, following a thesis on "Vichy and the Commissariat-General for Jewish Affairs (1941-1944)". He joined the CNRS in 2006, and was a member of the Research Center for Quantitative History until January 2015.

Joly is now a Research Director at the CNRS. He earned the "prize of the Jewish research book" in 2007.

Works 

 Xavier Vallat (1891-1972) : du nationalisme chrétien à l'antisémitisme d'État. Grasset, 2001..
 Darquier de Pellepoix et l'antisémitisme français. Berg international, 2002..
 Vichy dans la « Solution finale » : histoire du Commissariat général aux questions juives (1941-1944). Grasset, 2006.
 La France antijuive de 1936 : l'agression de Léon Blum à la Chambre des députés. (with Tal Bruttmann) Éditions des Équateurs, 2006.
 L'Antisémitisme de bureau : enquête au cœur de la Préfecture de police de Paris et du Commissariat général aux questions juives (1940-1944). Grasset, 2011.
 Les collabos : treize portraits d'après les archives des services secrets de Vichy, des RG et de l'Épuration. Les Échappés, 2011
 Naissance de l'Action française : Maurice Barrès, Charles Maurras et l'extrême droite nationaliste au tournant du XXe siècle. Grasset, 2015.
 Dénoncer les Juifs sous l'Occupation : Paris, 1940-1944. CNRS Éditions, 2017.
 L'État contre les juifs : Vichy, les nazis et la persécution antisémite. Grasset, 2018.
 La falsification de l'Histoire: Eric Zemmour, l'extrême droite, Vichy et les juifs. Grasset, 2022.

References 

Living people
1976 births
21st-century French historians
Academics and writers on far-right extremism
French National Centre for Scientific Research scientists
University of Paris alumni
Place of birth missing (living people)
Historians of Vichy France
Historians of France
Historians of fascism
Historians of the Holocaust
Research directors of the French National Centre for Scientific Research